Zoltan Ritli (born 13 July 1968) is a retired Romanian footballer who played for Inter Sibiu, Steaua București, U Cluj and Rocar București between 1991 and 2001. He is currently a football manager.

External links
 
 Profile at SteauaFC.com

1968 births
Living people
Sportspeople from Satu Mare
Romanian sportspeople of Hungarian descent
Romanian footballers
Association football goalkeepers
FC Inter Sibiu players
FC Olimpia Satu Mare players
Liga I players
Liga II players
FC Universitatea Cluj players
FC Steaua București players
AFC Rocar București players
Romanian football managers
FC Olimpia Satu Mare managers
CS Minaur Baia Mare (football) managers